Hydrovatus acuminatus, is a species of predaceous diving beetle found in Oriental and African regions.

Distribution
It is found in many countries including; India, Sri Lanka, Indonesia, Myanmar, Turkey, Iran, Iraq, Saudi Arabia, Egypt, Gambia, Sudan, Ethiopia, Nigeria, Ghana, Malawi, Tanzania, Namibia, Mozambique, South Africa, Madagascar, Seychelles, China, Japan, Taiwan, Thailand, Cambodia, Vietnam, Malaysia, Singapore, Philippines, and Micronesia.

Description
Body length is about 2.3 mm. Clypeus without raised front-margin. Both dorsum and ventrum are yellowish brown. Pronotum and wing-case are sparingly
and finely punctate.

References 

Dytiscidae
Insects of Sri Lanka
Insects described in 1859